Douwe Jorn Amels (born 16 September 1991) is a Dutch track and field athlete who specialises in the high jump. He won the gold medal at the 2023 European Indoor Championships, becoming the first Dutchman ever to win gold in the event and the first high jump medallist at these championships since 1977. Amels claimed also gold at the 2013 European Under-23 Championships.

He represented Netherlands at the World Championships in Athletics in 2013 and 2019. He is the joint Dutch indoor record holder for the high jump, and won almost 20 national titles (outdoors and indoors).

Career
Born in Drachten, Douwe Amels' family was interested in athletics and joined Impala, a local club, to work with coach Hans-Jörg Thomaskamp.

In 2010, he set a national junior record for the high jump and competed at the World Junior Championships in Athletics held in Moncton, Canada. His first senior national titles followed in 2011 and 2012, when he won both outdoor and indoor titles.

He failed to improve upon his best in the 2014 and 2015 seasons (jumping 2.23 m and 2.24 m, respectively), though he was also undertaking a degree in corporate law at the Erasmus Universiteit Rotterdam during this period. Amels appeared for the Netherlands at the 2014 European Team Championships Super League, placing ninth, and jumped in the qualifying round of the 2015 Summer Universiade.

He equalled his personal best of 2.28 m in Zoetermeer (NED) on 28 August 2019, qualifying for the 2019 World Championships in Doha, Qatar, where he did not advance to the final.

At the 2023 European Indoor Championships in Istanbul, the 31-year-old equalled Wilbert Pennings' Dutch record of 2.31 m dating back to 2002 to claim the gold medal, the biggest success of his career up to that point. It was the first Dutch title in the men's high jump in history and the first high jump medal for the Netherlands in these championships since Ruud Wielart's bronze in 1977.

Statistics

International competitions

1No mark in the final

National titles
 Dutch Athletics Championships
 High jump: 2011, 2012, 2013, 2014, 2018, 2019, 2020, 2021, 2022
 Dutch Indoor Athletics Championships
 High jump: 2011, 2012, 2014, 2015, 2018, 2020, 2021, 2022, 2023

See also
List of high jump national champions (men)

References

External links

 
 

1991 births
Living people
Dutch male high jumpers
People from Drachten
Sportspeople from Friesland
World Athletics Championships athletes for the Netherlands
Dutch Athletics Championships winners
Competitors at the 2015 Summer Universiade
21st-century Dutch people
20th-century Dutch people